This is a list of known Lonchocarpus Kunth species (lancepods), organized in alphabetical order. , a total of 163 species were accepted in Plants of the World Online:

References

 
Lonchocarpus